Vaughan Murray Griffin (11 Nov 1903 – 29 January 1992) was an Australian print maker and painter.

Life and work
Commonly known as Murray Griffin, he was born in the Melbourne suburb of Malvern to Vaughan and Ethel Griffin. He spent most of his life living in the Eaglemont and Heidelberg area in Melbourne although he also travelled around country Victoria to paint and draw. He produced an extensive body of landscape paintings as well as portraits, but he is best known for his printmaking, where he was heavily influenced by Japanese woodcuts.  A number of these prints are on the National Gallery of Australia database.

Griffin trained at the National Gallery of Victoria Art School in Melbourne from 1919 to 1923. He later taught art at Scotch College (1936 to 1937) and drawing and teaching at RMIT (1937 to 1940).

Griffin was appointed an official war artist in 1941 to work with the 8th Australian Division in Malaya. During his three months' service there he completed pictures which were prepared for transport to Australia, but which did not leave the country, and are lost.  He served in that theatre of war from November 1941until he was captured by the Japanese in February 1942 after the fall of Singapore and incarcerated for three and a half years as a POW in Changi Prison, in conditions slightly less harsh than many other Japanese camps. During his imprisonment he made a series of drawings recording his experiences and he exhibited them on his return. The Australian War Memorial holds an extensive collection of this work, but in the exhibition Paintings, Drawings and Sculpture by Australian Official War Artists 1943-44 a note explained that his self-portrait was "the only work of Murray Griffin that can be shown."

From 1946 to 1953 he was a teacher of drawing at the National Gallery of Victoria Art School and then was Senior Lecturer in Art at RMIT from 1954 to 1968. He became known for his colour prints of birds and animals.

Griffin was influenced by Anthroposophy and the teachings of Rudolf Steiner. This passion resulted in a body of oil paintings and linocuts known as the Journey Series. This collection is currently held by La Trobe University.

Galleries
Griffin's works are held by: 
 National Gallery of Australia
 Australian War Memorial
 National Gallery of Victoria
 State Library of Victoria
 Art Gallery of South Australia
 Queensland Art Gallery/Gallery of Modern Art
 Castlemaine Art Museum
 Ballarat Fine Art Gallery
 Warrnambool Art Gallery
 Geelong Art Gallery
 Newcastle Art Gallery
 Print Council of Australia
 The Ian Potter Museum of Art, University of Melbourne
 Victorian College of the Arts, University of Melbourne
 La Trobe University
 Federation University Art Collection
 Australian Embassy Washington

Exhibitions 
 1943, from 1 December; Inclusion in a group show of ninety-one paintings and etchings with Arnold Shore, Max Meldrum, John Rowell, Jas. Quinn, John Farmer, Mary Hurry, Dora Serle, Margaret Pestell, Dora Wilson, Isabel Tweddle, Aileen Dent, Allan Jordan, Geo. Colville, and Victor Cog. Hawthorn Library.

Prizes and awards
1923 - First prizes National Gallery School for Painting and Landscape painting
1935 - Crouch prize for the oil painting Golden Barriers
1939 - F. E. Richardson prize for the linocut Spoonbill 
1952 - Dunlop Prize (joint 2nd) for the oil painting Warrior
1957 - Maude Vizard-Wholohan Prize Art gallery of South Australia for the linocut Bird of Paradise
1976 - Henri Worland Memorial Art Prize Warrnambool Art gallery for the linocut Duck in Reeds
1990 - Victorian Artists Society Honour Medal for "outstanding contributions to art"

References

External links
 Artist profile at the Australian War Memorial

1903 births
1992 deaths
Australian printmakers
20th-century Australian painters
Australian prisoners of war
20th-century printmakers
World War II prisoners of war held by Japan
Australian Army personnel of World War II
Australian Army soldiers
People from Heidelberg, Victoria
Australian war artists
Artists from Melbourne
People from Malvern, Victoria
Military personnel from Melbourne
Scotch College, Melbourne
National Gallery of Victoria Art School alumni